Martin Grashev Mladenov (born 14 January 1987) is a Bulgarian cyclist.

Palmares
2009
3rd Tour of Vojvodina I
2011
2nd Overall Tour of Bulgaria
1st Stage 2b
3rd Overall Tour of Szeklerland
1st Stage 3a
2012
1st Grand Prix Dobrich I

References

1987 births
Living people
Bulgarian male cyclists